Donald Bradley Shultz Jr. (born May 15, 1982) is the rhythm guitarist and one of the founding members of the band Cage the Elephant, and is also a record producer. Born in Bowling Green, Kentucky, he now resides in Nashville, Tennessee, with his wife and two children. He is the older brother to current Cage the Elephant bandmate, Matt Shultz.

History 
Before Cage the Elephant, Shultz was in a band with current bandmates Jared Champion and Matt Shultz known as Perfect Confusion. Perfect Confusion formed in 2001, and played smaller music venues around their hometown, Bowling Green. The band broke up in 2005, but the former members occasionally have reunions and performances.

Career 
After Cage the Elephant formed in 2006, Shultz, along with the rest of the band, moved to the United Kingdom to gain moderate success with their self-titled debut LP, releasing in Europe on June 23, 2008, and in the United States on March 24, 2009.

Along with being a member of Cage the Elephant, he is a record producer. He has produced Juliette Lewis' Future Deep EP, Nashville band Bad Cop's The Light On EP, and Bowling Green band Dan Luke and The Raid's debut LP, Out Of The Blue, among other indie artists' EPs and LPs.

Personal life 
In May 2007, Shultz and his wife, Lindsay, got married. In September 2013, the Shultz's first child was born. In November 2019, the couple welcomed their second child.

References

1982 births
21st-century American guitarists
American rock guitarists
Cage the Elephant members
Living people
Musicians from Bowling Green, Kentucky